"Perdóname" is a 2007 single by Panamanian duo La Factoría and Eddy Lover from their first studio album, Nuevas Metas (2006). A remix of the song features dancehall artist Adrian Banton.

Chart history

Billboard singles charts

Accolades
American Society of Composers, Authors, and Publishers Awards

|-
|rowspan="1" scope="row"|2009
|Perdóname
|Urban Song of the Year
|
|-

References

2007 singles
Reggaeton songs
Spanish-language songs
2006 songs
Universal Music Latino singles